Ezekiel 2 is the second chapter of the Book of Ezekiel in the Hebrew Bible or the Old Testament of the Christian Bible. This book contains the prophecies attributed to the prophet/priest Ezekiel and is one of the Book of the Prophets.

Text
The original text was written in the Hebrew language. This chapter is divided into 10 verses.

Textual witnesses

Some early manuscripts containing the text of this chapter in Hebrew are of the Masoretic Text, which includes the Codex Cairensis (895), the Petersburg Codex of the Prophets (916), Aleppo Codex (10th century), Codex Leningradensis (1008).

There is also a translation into Koine Greek known as the Septuagint, made in the last few centuries BC. Extant ancient manuscripts of the Septuagint version include Codex Vaticanus (B; B; 4th century), Codex Alexandrinus (A; A; 5th century) and Codex Marchalianus (Q; Q; 6th century).

Verse 2
 Then the Spirit entered me when He spoke to me,
 and set me on my feet;
 and I heard Him who spoke to me.
 "The Spirit": as "an empowerment" that Ezekiel's revelations and messages are from God.

Verse 10
 Then He spread it before me;'
 and there was writing on the inside and on the outside, and written on it were lamentations and mourning and woe.''
"On the inside and on the outside": unlike the ordinary scrolls which contain writing on only one side, this scroll was described as full of words on both side, dramatizing the fact that the oracle was given to Ezekiel by God. This may indicate a knowledge of Jeremiah's scrolls (.

See also
 Son of man
Related Bible parts: Jeremiah 1, Ezekiel 1, Ezekiel 3, Zechariah 5, Revelation 5, Revelation 10

Notes

References

Sources

External links

Jewish
Ezekiel 2 Masoretic Hebrew with Parallel English
Ezekiel 2 Hebrew with Rashi's Commentary

Christian
Ezekiel 2 English Translation with Parallel Latin Vulgate

02